Made of Hate is a Polish band.

Discography
 Bullet in Your Head (2008)
 Pathogen (2010)
 Out of Hate (2014)

Members
Current
 Michał "Mike" Kostrzyński - guitars, backing vocals (2007–present)
 Radek Półrolniczak - lead vocals (2007–present)
 Maciek Krawczyk - bass guitar (2016–present)
 Tomek Grochowski - drums (2007–present)

Former 
 Jarek Kajszczak - bass guitar (2007-2012)
 Marlena Rutkowska - bass guitar (2012–present)

References

External links

Musical groups established in 2007
Polish melodic death metal musical groups
Musical quartets